Four Square is a historic home and farm located near Smithfield, Isle of Wight County, Virginia. The original structure was built in 1807, and is a two-story, five bay, "L"-shaped frame dwelling.  Also on the property are eight contributing domestic outbuildings, and a variety of barns and other farm buildings.

It was listed on the National Register of Historic Places in 1979.

References

Houses on the National Register of Historic Places in Virginia
Farms on the National Register of Historic Places in Virginia
Houses completed in 1807
Houses in Isle of Wight County, Virginia
National Register of Historic Places in Isle of Wight County, Virginia